Homographs are words with the same spelling but having more than one meaning. Homographs may be pronounced the same (homophones), or they may be pronounced differently (heteronyms, also known as heterophones).

Some homographs are nouns or adjectives when the accent is on the first syllable, and verbs when it is on the second. When the prefix "re-" is added to a monosyllabic word, the word gains currency both as a noun and as a verb.

Most of the pairs listed below are closely related: for example, "absent" as a noun meaning "missing", and as a verb meaning "to make oneself missing". There are also many cases in which homographs are of an entirely separate origin, or whose meanings have diverged to the point that present-day speakers have little historical understanding: for example, "bat".  Many, though not all of these, have first syllables that evolved from Latin. Also, some words only exhibit stress alternation in certain dialects of English. For a list of homographs with different pronunciations (heteronyms) see Heteronym (linguistics).

 absent
 accent
 action
 adder
 address
 advocate
agape
alternate
 analyses
 appropriate
 ash
 axes
 back
 balance
 ball
 balls
 bank
 bar
 bark
 bass
bat
battery
 bay
 bear
 bimonthly
bow
 brace
 brilliant
 buck
 buffet
 building
 can
 capital
 carp
 certain
 character
 chest
 cleave
 clerical
 clip
 close
 club
 combat
 combine
 commune
 console
 contact
 content
 contest
 contract
 converse
 convert
 cool
 crane
 dab
 damper
 date
 dear
 decrease
 default
 degree
 deliberate
 desert
 die
 discharge
 discount
 dismiss
 dismount
 display
 Djibouti
 does
 doing
 dove
 down
 drain
 drawer
 dub
 duck
 duplicate
 effect
 elaborate
 engage
 entrance
 even
 evening
 excuse
 exploit
 extract
 fall
 fan
 fairly
 file
 finance
 fine
 firm
 float
 flush
 fly
 float
 foot
 football field
 funny
 gas
 gay
 Georgia
 go
 gorge
 grave
 gyro
 harbor
 hard
 hew
hive
 hoe
 impact
 implant
 import
 impound
 incline
 inclined
 increase
 insert
 insult
 intercept
 interchange
 intestine
 intimate
 into
 intrigue
 invalid
 invite 
 jam
 just
 kind
 land
 lead
 learned
 leave
 leaves
 Lebanon
 left
 letter
 lie
 light
 lighter
 lit
 live
 lose
 lumber
 Luxembourg
 manifest
 mark
 mass
 match
 may
 mean
 median
 mind
 mint
 minute
 mode
 model
 mole
 moped
 mortar
 mouse
 murder
 nail
 notice
 novel
 number
 nut
 obituary
 object
 objective
 obtuse
 odd
 offense
 one
 ought
 overcount
 overlay
 overlook
 palm
 park
 patient
 pen
 pencil
 perfect
 perfume
 permit
 pervert
 pitch
 pin
 plain
 plaster
 play
 polish
 pop
 portmanteau
 possess
 pound
 predate
 present
 pretty
 proceeds
 progress
 project
 protest
 purpose
 putting
 quail
 quarry
 quarter
 racket
 read
 rebel
 recall
 recap
 recess
 record
 redress
 refund
 refuse
 regress
 reject
 relapse
 remake
 research
 resent
 reservation
 resume
 retake
 retard
 retract
 revolt
 right
 ring
 rock
 roll
 rose
 round
 row
 ruler
 San Marino
 saw
 scale
 scared
 school
 seal
 second
 sewer
 sheer
 short
 shorts
 show
 shower
 sign
 sink
 skied
 sow
 spirit 
 spoke
 spring
 stone
 story
 straight
 subject
 survey
 suspect
 tear
 theory
 they
 tie
 toll
 too
 top
 train
 transfer
 transform
 transplant
 transport
 transpose
 type
 undercount
 update
 uplift
 upset
 venery
 virus
 Washington
 watch
 wave
 widget
 wind
 window
 wound
 yard
 you

See also

 Initial-stress-derived noun
 List of English words with disputed usage

External links
 List and analysis of English homographs by John Higgins
 Opundo's Homographs
 The Heteronym Page
 The Home of the Heteronym: There's a Sewer in the Sewer
 Homograph Examples
 Homographs Useful Tips and Information

English orthography
Lists of English words
Homonymy